Thomas A. Crews House is a historic home located at Walkertown, Forsyth County, North Carolina.  It was built 1891, and is a two-story, vernacular Queen Anne style frame dwelling, enlarged to its present size in 1911. It features a one-story, shed-roofed, wrap-around porch.  Also on the property are the contributing brick wash house (1891), a frame smokehouse (1891), barn (1891), pump house, chicken house, wood shed, equipment shed or "gear house," and the 65 foot brick smokestack of the former Crews Tobacco Factory (1891).

It was listed on the National Register of Historic Places in 1993.

References

Houses on the National Register of Historic Places in North Carolina
Queen Anne architecture in North Carolina
Houses completed in 1891
Houses in Winston-Salem, North Carolina
National Register of Historic Places in Forsyth County, North Carolina